Q85 may refer to:
 Q85 (New York City bus)
 Al-Burooj, a surah of the Quran